Darreh Bidi Sefidar (also Romanized as Darreh Bīdī Sefīdār; also known as Darreh Bīd) is a village in Sepidar Rural District, in the Central District of Boyer-Ahmad County, Kohgiluyeh and Boyer-Ahmad Province, Iran. At the 2006 census, its population was 56, in 11 families.

References 

Populated places in Boyer-Ahmad County